Gogolin may refer to the following places:
Gogolin, Bydgoszcz County in Kuyavian-Pomeranian Voivodeship (north-central Poland)
Gogolin, Grudziądz County in Kuyavian-Pomeranian Voivodeship (north-central Poland)
Gogolin in Opole Voivodeship (south-west Poland)
Gogolin, Łódź Voivodeship (central Poland)